Pakala is a town in Tirupati district of the Indian state of Andhra Pradesh. It is the mandal headquarters of Pakala mandal. It comes under Tirupati revenue division.

About 
Pakala is a mandal in Tirupati district of Andhra Pradesh, India. Pakala Mandal Headquarters is Pakala town. It belongs to Rayalaseema region. It is located 44 km towards West from District headquarters Tirupathi. 450 km from State capital Amaravathi .

Pakala Mandal is bounded by Puthalapattu Mandal towards South, Penumuru Mandal towards South, Pulicherla H/O Reddivaripalle Mandal towards North, Irala Mandal towards west. Chittoor and Tirupati are the nearby cities to Pakala.

Pakala consists of 180 villages and 28 panchayats. Nagamma Agraharam is the smallest village and Pakala is the biggest village. It is in the 371 m elevation (altitude).

Chittoor, Tirupati (Tirumala), Vellore, Thiruthani, Srikalahasti are the nearby important tourist destinations to see.

Education 
The primary and secondary school education is imparted by government, aided and private schools, under the School Education Department of the state.[2][3] The medium of instruction followed by different schools are English, Telugu and Urdu.

Colleges

 Govt. Degree College
 Govt. Junior College (boys)
 Govt Junior College (girls)
 Sri Bala Gangadhar Reddy Arts & Science College (SBGR)

Schools

 Govt Secondary High School
 N.V.N (MPP) Primary School
 Infant Jesus English Medium High School
 Sri Vivekananda Vidyanikethan High School
 RCM high School
 Y.v. Rathnam School
 Ushodaya High School

Demographics 
Telugu is the official and widely spoken language. Also people speak Urdu. 
Total population of Pakala Mandal is 56,802 living in 13,533 houses, Spread across total 180 villages and 28 panchayats. Males are 28,414 and females are 28,388

Geography 

It has an average elevation of 361 meters (1184 feet).

Distance 

 Chittoor      30 km
 Tirupati      43 km
 Tirumala      61 km
 Vellore       66 km
 Srikalahasti  80 km
 Madanapalle   85 km
 Pileru        32 km
 Chennai       178 km
 Bengaluru     221 km
 Vijayawada    485 km
 Hyderabad     550 km

Governance 
Pakala(Chandragiri) is one of the 175 assembly constituencies of Andhra Pradesh Legislative Assembly, India. pakala is part of Chittoor (Lok Sabha constituency). N. Reddeppa of YSR Congress Party is the sitting Member of Parliament for Chittoor (Lok Sabha constituency) and Chevireddy Bhaskar Reddy of YSR Congress Party is Chandragiri the sitting Member of Legislative Assembly for Chandragiri (Assembly constituency).

Politics
Pakala is an Assembly constituency in Andhra Pradesh and the constituency number is 285.

Entertainment
There are two theaters in pakala town, Ramakrishna Theatre, Srinivas & Mini Theatre

Transport 

Roadways

Pakala is well connected to major cities through national and state highways. The National Highways through Pakala Town are, National Highway 40 (India) connecting Pileru, Madanapalli, Kadapa, Kurnool and Hyderabad on North and connecting Chittoor, Vellore and Chennai on South National Highway 69 (India) connecting Chittoor with Kolar and Bangalore on West National Highway 140 (India) connecting Chittoor with Tirupati and Nellore on East. The city has total road length of 382.30 km.

Public transport

The Andhra Pradesh State Road Transport Corporation operates bus services from Chittoor bus station. Bus services are operated to Chittoor, Tirupati,Pileru, Madanapalli, Palamaner, Srikalahasti, Nellore,  and also to all other major Panchayth and Villages in the Pakala, Chittoor District, Chittoor District, Andhra Pradesh.

Railways
Chittoor railway station is a National railway station in Chittoor city of Andhra Pradesh. It lies on Gudur–Katpadi branch line section and is administered under Guntakal railway division of South Central Railway zone. Katpadi Junction railway station, Tamil Nadu, is 70 km from Pakala Town.

Airports

The nearest domestic airport is Tirupati Airport at Renigunta in Tirupati of Tirupati district, Andhra Pradesh.

The nearest international airports are Chennai International Airport at Chennai and Kempegowda International Airport at Bangalore.

Climate

Villages Under Pakala Mandal
List of all towns and Villages in Pakala Mandal of Tirupati district, Andhra Pradesh. Complete details of Population, Religion, Literacy and Sex Ratio in tabular format. 
us 2011

Home Andhra Pradesh District List Tirupati District Pakala Mandal 

List of all towns and Villages in Pakala Mandal of Tirupati district, Andhra Pradesh. Complete details of Population, Religion, Literacy and Sex Ratio in tabular format. 

 Achamma Agraharam,
 Adenapalle,
 Damalcheruvu,
 Gadanki,
 Ganugapenta,
 Gorpadu,
 K.oddepalle,
 Linganapalli,
 Maddinayanipalle,
 Mallelacheruvupalli, 
 Mogarala
 Nagamma Agraharam,
 Nendragunta,
 Padiputlabayalu,
 Pakala,
 Pedda Ramapuram,
 Thotathimmaiah Palle,
 Vallivedu,
 Upparapalli.

Landmarks 
The Swayambu Varasidhi Vinayakaswamy temple at Kanipakam is the famous notable Hindu temple near the city.

The 11th century historical Chandragiri Fort is the notable landmark near the city.

From Pakala Town we have NARL National Atmosphere and Research Laboratory towards Tirupati 5 km from town

References 

Towns in Tirupati district
Mandal headquarters in Tirupati district